Connecting Rooms is a 1970 British drama film written and directed by Franklin Gollings. The screenplay is based on the play The Cellist by Marion Hart. The film stars Bette Davis, Michael Redgrave, and Leo Genn.

Plot
The plot explores the relationships shared by the residents of a seedy boarding house owned by dour Mrs. Brent. Among them are busker Wanda Fleming, who is flattered by the attention paid her by rebellious pop songwriter wannabe Mickey Hollister, and former schoolmaster James Wallraven, who has been accused of pedophilia and reduced to working as a janitor in an art gallery.

Cast
 Bette Davis as Wanda Fleming
 Michael Redgrave as James Wallraven
 Alexis Kanner as Mickey Hollister
 Kay Walsh as Mrs. Brent
 Leo Genn as Dr. Norman
 Olga Georges-Picot as Claudia Fouchet
 Richard Wyler as Dick Grayson
 Mark Jones as Johnny
 Gabrielle Drake as Jean
 Brian Wilde as Ellerman
 John Woodnutt as Doctor

Production
The Paramount Pictures release was filmed on location in Bayswater. It was made in 1969, was given a limited release in the United States in 1970, and opened in the UK in 1972.

Scenes in which Wanda Fleming played the cello featured close-ups of the hands of British classical cellist Amaryllis Fleming.

In a scene set in the West End theatre district, a theatre marquee lists Margo Channing as one of the cast of the play it is housing. Margo Channing was the name of the character Bette Davis portrayed in All About Eve.

Critical reception
In his review in Film Threat, Phil Hall describes the film as "a compelling and often heartbreaking drama" and adds "Redgrave, who was never the most subtle screen actor...manages to reign in his hammy tendencies and find the angst and isolation in the disgraced teacher's existence." Regarding Davis, Hall writes: "When her secret is revealed, Davis' character says absolutely nothing. Instead, her body freezes slightly while her eyes (yes, those Bette Davis eyes) give a look which is initially shameful, but then suddenly appear to present endless relief. In her silence and her ocular expression, Davis achieves a state of grace which is astonishing to behold."

Time Out London wrote "Riddled with act and scene pauses...it's a fairly classic condensation of several fetishistic concerns endemic to British cinema."

TV Guide calls it a "dull, sappy melodrama."

References

External links

1970 films
1970 drama films
British drama films
British films based on plays
Paramount Pictures films
Films shot at Pinewood Studios
Films shot in England
Films set in London
Films produced by Dimitri de Grunwald
1970s English-language films
1970s British films